The 1999 World Cup of Golf took place 18–21 November at the Mines Resort and Golf Club in Kuala Lumpur, Malaysia. It was the 45th World Cup. The tournament was a 72-hole stroke play team event (32 teams) with each team consisting of two players from a country. The combined score of each team determined the team results. Individuals also competed for the International Trophy. The prize money totaled $1,500,000 with $400,000 going to the winning pair and $100,000 to the top individual. The American team of Mark O'Meara and Tiger Woods won by five strokes over the Spanish team of Santiago Luna and Miguel Ángel Martín. Woods also took the International Trophy with the best total individual score in tournament history and by a tournament record margin of nine strokes over Frank Nobilo of New Zealand.

Teams

Source

Scores
Team

Source

International Trophy

Source

References

World Cup (men's golf)
Golf tournaments in Malaysia
Sport in Kuala Lumpur
World Cup golf
World Cup golf
World Cup golf